This is a list of Czech international footballers, comprising all players to have represented the Czech Republic national football team since its formation in 1994.

List

Notes

References

 
Association football player non-biographical articles